Adolf Wiesner (1807 – September 23, 1867) was an Austrian journalist, playwright, author, and revolutionary who fled to the United States after the Revolutions of 1848.

Biography
Wiesner was born Adolf Wiener to a Jewish family in Prague in 1807, though later changed his surname to Wiesner after converting to Roman Catholicism due to his desire to pursue a legal career. After practicing law in Vienna for a few years, Wiesner began his writing career, which included several successful plays, with the aid of Franz Anton von Kolowrat-Liebsteinsky, the Interior Minister of the Austrian Empire. 

In 1846, Wiesner left Vienna for Frankfurt due to the political situation in the former. He was elected to the short-lived revolutionary Frankfurt Parliament in 1848 and sat with the extreme Left. During his brief tenure as a parliamentarian, he was the editor of the Frankfurter Oberpostamts-Zeitung.

Following the dissolution of the Frankfurt Parliament and the end of the revolutions, Wiesner chose to immigrate to the United States alongside many other revolutionaries. He first settled in New York, where he worked for steamship and railroad companies before returning to journalism as the editor of Geist der Weltliteratur in 1860. He then moved to Baltimore where he edited the Turn-Zeitung and became an active leader of the Republican Party there. During the American Civil War, Wiesner engaged in work to assist wounded Union soldiers, which earned him an appointment in the Baltimore Customs House. After the war ended, he went to Chicago and worked briefly for the Illinois Staats-Zeitung. When the general amnesty was declared in Germany, he decided to return home but suffered from Typhoid fever and died shortly after arriving in New York City.

Selected bibliography

Plays
Inez de Castro, 1842 
Die Geiseln und der Negersklave
Der Fiend
Der Arzt und Seine Tochter

Political works
Russisch-Politische Arithmetik, 1844 (2 volumes)
Denkwürdigkeiten der Oesterreichischen Censur vom Zeitalter der Reformation bis auf die Gegenwart, 1847

References

1807 births
1867 deaths
Journalists from Prague
Politicians from Prague
German-American Forty-Eighters
German revolutionaries
People of the Revolutions of 1848
Members of the Frankfurt Parliament
19th-century American journalists
American newspaper editors
American writers in German
Jewish Czech politicians
Illinois Staats-Zeitung people